An unqualified reference to  Lord Wentworth could mean:

Thomas Wentworth, 1st Baron Wentworth (1501–1551)
Thomas Wentworth, 2nd Baron Wentworth (1525–1584)
Henry Wentworth, 3rd Baron Wentworth (1558–1593)
Thomas Wentworth, 1st Earl of Cleveland (1591–1667) 
Thomas Wentworth, 1st Earl of Strafford (1593–1641) 
William Wentworth, 2nd Earl of Strafford (1626–1695)